Douglas James Tobias is an American chemist who is professor and chair of the Department of Chemistry at the University of California, Irvine. His research is in the fields of biophysical, theoretical, and computational chemistry. He was elected a fellow of the American Association for the Advancement of Science in 2006. He was elected a fellow of the American Chemical Society in 2013 and of the American Physical Society in 2014. In 2014, he received the Theoretical Chemistry Award from the American Chemical Society's Division of Physical Chemistry, and in 2017, he received the Soft Matter and Biophysical Chemistry Award from the Royal Society of Chemistry.

References

External links
Faculty page
Lab website

Living people
University of California, Irvine faculty
20th-century American chemists
21st-century American chemists
Fellows of the American Association for the Advancement of Science
University of California, Riverside alumni
Carnegie Mellon University alumni
Fellows of the American Chemical Society
Fellows of the American Physical Society
Computational chemists
Year of birth missing (living people)